Terqa is the name of an ancient city discovered at the site of Tell Ashara on the banks of the middle Euphrates in Deir ez-Zor Governorate, Syria, approximately  from the modern border with Iraq and  north of the ancient site of Mari, Syria. Its name had become Sirqu by Neo-Assyrian times.

History

Little is yet known of the early history of Terqa, though it was a sizable entity even in the Early Dynastic period.

In the early 2nd millennium BC it was under the control of Shamshi-Adad (c. 1808–1776 BC) of the Amorite Kingdom of Upper Mesopotamia, followed by Mari beginning with the reign of the Amorite ruler Yahdun-Lim one of whose year names was "Year in which Yahdun-Lim built the city walls of Mari and Terqa". Control by Mari continued into the time of Zimri-Lim (c. 1775 to 1761 BC). One year name of Zimri-Lim was "Year in which Zimri-Lim offered a great throne to Dagan of Terqa". Control shifted to Babylon after Mari's defeat by Hammurabi (c. 1810 – c. 1750 BC) of the First Babylonian dynasty in his 33rd year of reign. Terqa became the leading city of the kingdom of Khana after the decline of Babylon. Later, it fell into the sphere of the Kassite dynasty of Babylon and eventually the Neo-Assyrian Empire. A noted stele of Assyrian king Tukulti-Ninurta II (890 to 884 BC) was found near Terqa.

The principal god of Terqa was Dagan.

Proposed Rulers of Terqa 

In mid-15th century BC, Terqa came under the control of the Mitanni kingdom. Kings Sinia and Qiš-Addu ruled during the time of the Mitanni kings Sausadatra, Sa’itarna and Parattarna.

According to Podany (2014),

 "The kings who called themselves “king of the land of Hana” and who were not associated with the names of Mittanian rulers (i.e., those other than Sinia and Qiš-Addu [both mid-15th century]) ruled for at least seven and perhaps as many as eight generations. The first four passed the throne from father to son: Iddin-Kakka [late 15th century] → Išar-Lim → Iggid-Lim → Isih-Dagan [early 14th century]."

Archaeology
Two thirds of the remains of Terqa are covered by the modern town of Ashara, which limits the possibilities for excavation.

The site was briefly excavated by Ernst Herzfeld in 1910. In 1923, 5 days of excavations were conducted by François Thureau-Dangin and P. Dhorrne.

From 1974 to 1986, Terqa was excavated for 10 seasons by a team from the International Institute for Mesopotamian Area Studies including the Institute of Archaeology at the University of California at Los Angeles, California State University at Los Angeles, Johns Hopkins University, the University of Arizona and the University of Poitiers in France. The team was led by Giorgio Buccellati and Marilyn Kelly-Buccellati. The final reports from these excavations have been released over time. The same team also excavated the nearby (5 kilometers north) 4th Millennium site of Tell Qraya which they viewed as the probably source for the settlement of Terqa. After 1987, a French team led by Olivier Rouault of Lyon University took over the dig and continued to work there until local conditions deteriorated around 2010.

There are 550 cuneiform tablets from Terqa held at the Deir ez-Zor Museum.

Notable features found at Terqa include

Based on ceramic and radiocarbon dating the inner wall was built c. 2900 B.C., the middle wall c. 2800 BC and the outer wall c. 2700 BC and the fortifications were in use until at least 2000 BC.
A temple to Ninkarrak dating at least as old as the 3rd millennium. The temple finds included Egyptian scarabs.
The House of Puzurum, where a large and important archive of Khana Period tablets, mostly contracts for purchases of land and houses in the Terqa area, were found. The location produced a number of sealing (on tablets, tags, and bullae). Many of the tablets are dated to the time of ruler Yadib-Abu. A few Mari Period sealings were found elsewhere at the site.

Temple to Ninkarrak 
Ninkarrak was the ancient goddess of healing. Her temple was identified based on a tablet with a list of offerings which starts with her name, and by seals mentioned the goddess. Thousands of beads made out of precious materials such as agate, carnelian, and lapis lazuli were found here.

Archaeologists also found a number of small bronze figurines of dogs inside the temple as well. Dogs were the animals sacred to Ninkarrak.

A ceremonial axe and a scimitar with a devotional inscription mentioning Ninkarrak, both bronze, were also found.

Early occupation of the structure has been dated to roughly the same period as the reigns of three kings of Terqa. The earliest of them was Yadikh-abu, a contemporary of Samsuiluna of Babylon, defeated by the latter in 1721 BCE. Kashtiliash, and Shunuhru-ammu also ruled during this period. The temple was remodeled  multiple times.

The Egyptian scarabs found in the temple of Ninkarrak represent the easternmost known example of such objects in a sealed deposit dated to the Old Babylonian period. They are attributed to around 1650-1640 BC, or the Fifteenth Dynasty of Egypt. The hieroglyphs inscribed on them are regarded as "poorly executed and sometimes misunderstood," indicating Levantine, rather than Egyptian, origin. Similar scarabs are also known from Byblos, Sidon and Ugarit.

Temple to Lagamal 
Lagamal was a Mesopotamian deity worshiped chiefly in Dilbat, but it was prominent in Terqa as well, and also in Susa. This was a deity associated with the underworld.

In the majority of known sources Lagamal is a male deity, but it was regarded as a goddess rather than a god in Terqa.

Icehouse 

The oldest attested ice house (building) in the world may have been built in Terqa. It is recorded in a cuneiform tablet from c. 1780 BC that Zimri-Lim, the King of Mari ordered such a construction in Terqa, "which never before had any king built."

Trade 
Evidence of trade contacts with the Indus valley has been found here. Archaeologist Giorgio Buccellati found cloves, an important spice, in a burned-down house which was dated to 1720 BC.

"In the pantry of a house belonging to an individual named Puzurum, dated by tablets to c. 1700 BCE or slightly thereafter, were found 'a handful of cloves ... well preserved in a partly overturned jar of a medium size'."

Since this house was described as being of a medium size, it seems that, at that time, cloves were already accessible to the common people of Terqa.

Cloves are native to the Molucca Islands off the coast of Indonesia, and were extensively used in ancient India. This was the first evidence of cloves being used in the west before Roman times. The discovery  was first reported in 1978.

Genetics 
Dated to the period between 2.5 Kyrs BC and 0.5 Kyrs AD the studied individuals carried mtDNA haplotypes corresponding to the M4b1, M49 and M61 haplogroups, which are believed to have arisen in the area of the Indian subcontinent during the Upper Paleolithic and are absent in people living today in Syria. However, they are present in people inhabiting today’s India, Pakistan, Tibet and Himalayas.
A 2014 study expanding on the 2013 study and based on analysis of 15751 DNA samples arrives at the conclusion, that "M65a, M49 and/or M61 haplogroups carrying ancient Mesopotamians might have been the merchants from India".

See also
Cities of the ancient Near East

Notes

References

G. Buccellati, The Kingdom and Period of Khana, Bulletin of the American Schools of Oriental Research, no. 270, pp. 43–61, 1977
Giorgio Buccellati, "Terqa Preliminary Report 2: A Cuneiform Tablet of the Early Second Millennium B.C", Syro-Mesopotamian Studies 1, pp. 135-142, 1977
M. Chavalas, Terqa and the Kingdom of Khana, Biblical Archaeology, vol. 59, pp. 90–103, 1996
A. H. Podany, A Middle Babylonian Date for the Hana Kingdom, Journal of Cuneiform Studies, vol. 43/45, pp. 53–62, (1991–1993)
J. N. Tubb, A Reconsideration of the Date of the Second Millennium Pottery From the Recent Excavations at Terqa, Levant, vol. 12, pp. 61–68, 1980
A. Soltysiak, Human Remains from Tell Ashara - Terqa. Seasons 1999-2001. A Preliminary Report, Athenaeum, 90, no. 2, pp. 591–594 2002
J Tomczyk, A Sołtysiak, Preliminary report on human remains from Tell Ashara/Terqa. Season 2005, Athenaeum. Studi di Letteratura e Storia dell’Antichità, vol. 95 (1), pp. 439–441, soo7

External links
Terqa Final Reports
Terqa excavation web site
Terqa IIMAS website

Bronze Age sites in Syria
Former populated places in Syria
Archaeological sites in Deir ez-Zor Governorate
Mari, Syria